Connecticut's 78th House of Representatives district elects one member of the Connecticut House of Representatives. It consists of the town of Plymouth and parts of Bristol and has been represented by Republican Whit Betts since 2011.

List of representatives

Recent elections

2020

2018

2016

2014

2012

References

78